Sebastian Alexander Fundora (born 28 December 1997) is an American professional boxer. He is the current WBC interim Light middleweight champion, having held the belt since April 2022. As of November 2022, he is ranked as the third best active light middleweight by The Ring Magazine.

Professional boxing career
Fundora made his professional debut against Jose Cardenas on 24 September 2016. He won the fight by a first-round knockout. Fundora amassed a 12–0 record during the next three years. 

Fundora was booked to face the undefeated Donnie Marshall on 16 February 2019. He won the fight by a third-round knockout. Fundora faced another undefeated opponent, Hector Manuel Zepeda, on 21 June 2019 in the main event of Showtime's "ShoBox: The New Generation" card. Zepeda retired from the bout at the end of the fourth round. Fundora next faced Jamontay Clark for the vacant WBC Youth super welterweight title on 31 August 2019, on the undercard of the Erislandy Lara and Ramon Alvarez WBA super welterweight title bout. The fight was ruled a draw by split decision.

Fundora faced the unbeaten Daniel Lewis on 22 February 2020, on the Deontay Wilder vs. Tyson Fury II undercard. He won the fight by unanimous decision, with scores of 98–92, 99–91 and 97–93. Fundora was next booked to face Nathaniel Gallimore on 22 August 2020. He won the fight by a sixth-round knockout. Fundora faced Habib Ahmed on 5 December 2020, in his final fight of the year. He made quick work of Ahmed, winning the fight by a second-round knockout.

Fundora was booked to face Jorge Cota on 1 May 2021. He won the fight by a fourth-round technical knockout. Fundora was leading 30–27 on three of the judges' scorecards at the time of the stoppage. Fundora faced Sergio Garcia in a WBC super welterweight title eliminator on 5 December 2021, on the undercard of the Gervonta Davis and Isaac Cruz lightweight bout. Fundora won the fight by unanimous decision, with scores of 115–113, 118–110 and 117–111.

Fundora was booked to face Erickson Lubin for the WBC interim super welterweight title on 9 April 2022. The bout served as a WBC title eliminator as well, with the winner expected to face the victor of the title unification rematch between Jermell Charlo and Brian Castaño. He won the fight by a ninth-round stoppage, as Lubin was retired by his corner at the end of the round. Lubin (24-2, 17 KOs) rallied to score a knockdown of Fundora with a flurry of punches in the waning moments of Round 7 and was ahead on two scorecards 85-84 when the fight was stopped (the other score was 85-85).

Fundora made his first WBC interim super welterweight title against Carlos Ocampo on 8 October 2022. He retained the title by unanimous decision, with scores of 117–111, 118–110, and 119–109.

Fundora is scheduled to make his second WBC interim title defense against Brian Mendoza on 8 April 2023.

Professional boxing record

References

External links

 

1997 births
Living people
American male boxers
Light-middleweight boxers
Boxers from Florida
American boxers of Cuban descent
American boxers of Mexican descent
Sportspeople from West Palm Beach, Florida